New Canaries is a social democratic, Canarian nationalist political party representing the Canary Islands territory of Spain. The party holds Observer status in the European Free Alliance.

Electoral performance

Parliament of the Canary Islands

Cortes Generales

Notes

References

External links
  New Canaries official website

Political parties established in 2005
Regionalist parties in Spain
Political parties in the Canary Islands
Social democratic parties in Spain